Araguina-Sennola is an archaeological site in Corsica. The prehistoric shelter is located in the commune of Bonifacio.

References

Archaeological sites in Corsica
Prehistoric sites in France